The 2012 New York state elections took place on November 6, 2012. These elections included the 2012 presidential election, an election to one U.S. Senate seat, and elections to all 27 New York congressional seats, all 63 seats in the New York State Senate, and all 150 seats in the New York State Assembly.

Incumbent Democratic President Barack Obama defeated Republican nominee Mitt Romney in New York and was re-elected. Incumbent Democratic U.S. Senator Kirsten Gillibrand was re-elected as well. In New York's elections to the U.S. House of Representatives, Democrats won 21 seats and Republicans won six. The Republican Party lost its majority in the New York State Senate, as Democratic candidates won 33 of 63 seats; following the elections, however, Senate Republicans retained control of the State Senate through alliances with dissident Democrats. Democrats maintained control of the New York State Assembly.

Presidential election

New York had 29 electoral votes at stake. As is the case with most states, the electors were winner-takes-all. The candidates that achieved ballot access were as follows, in order of their position on the ballot:

Democratic Party: Barack Obama / Joe Biden
Republican Party: Mitt Romney / Paul Ryan
Conservative Party: Mitt Romney / Paul Ryan
Working Families Party: Barack Obama / Joe Biden
The Independence Party of New York, despite having automatic ballot access, will not field candidates.
Green Party: Jill Stein / Cheri Honkala
Party for Socialism and Liberation: Peta Lindsay / Yari Osorio
Libertarian Party: Gary Johnson / James P. Gray
Constitution Party: Virgil Goode / Jim Clymer

President Obama won New York by a 62.6%-36% margin over Gov. Mitt Romney.

United States Senate

Kirsten Gillibrand was appointed to the seat by Governor David Paterson in 2009, and was officially elected in a special election on November 2, 2010.  Senator Gillibrand sought re-election for a full term against Republican attorney Wendy E. Long, who defeated Nassau County Comptroller George Maragos and U.S. Representative Bob Turner in a primary election for the Republican Party nomination.  Sen. Gillibrand was re-elected by a margin of 71.9%-26.7% over Long.

United States House of Representatives

After a loss of two seats following the 2010 United States Census, the New York congressional delegation was reduced from twenty-nine to twenty-seven U.S. Representatives.  The two existing districts that were eliminated were District 9, held by Republican Rep. Bob Turner, and District 22, held by retiring Democratic Rep. Maurice Hinchey. Democratic Reps. Gary Ackerman and Democratic Maurice Hinchey, as well as freshman Republican Bob Turner, did not seek re-election to the House of Representatives.

On Election Day, the Democratic Party regained two seats previously held by Republicans, while the Republican Party regained one seat previously held by a Democrat. In total, 21 Democrats and six Republicans prevailed.

State Legislature

State Senate
Following the 2010 census, the Senate was redistricted effective in January 2013. The newly redistricted Senate was expanded from 62 to 63 seats.

On June 24, 2011, same-sex marriage became legal in New York upon the enactment of the Marriage Equality Act.  The passage of the Marriage Equality Act had an impact upon the 2012 State Senate elections, as three Republican senators who voted for the bill faced primary challenges and the Conservative Party of New York withdrew support for any candidate who had voted for the bill. (In New York, which allows fusion voting, Republican candidates are often endorsed by the Conservative Party.) Republican Senators Roy McDonald, James Alesi, Mark Grisanti, and Stephen Saland each voted in favor of the Marriage Equality Act. Carl Paladino, the 2010 Republican gubernatorial nominee, announced he would financially back primary candidates against Grisanti and Saland.  Sen. Alesi opted to retire instead of facing a potential primary challenge; Sen. McDonald lost a Republican primary to Saratoga County Clerk Kathy Marchione; and Sen. Saland won his Republican primary, but lost the general election to Democrat Terry Gipson by a margin of approximately 2,000 votes after his primary challenger, Neil Di Carlo, remained on the ballot on the Conservative line and acted as a spoiler.

Of the four Republican state senators who voted for the Marriage Equality Act in 2011, only Sen. Grisanti was re-elected in 2012. The Conservative Party endorsed former county legislator Charles Swanick (a registered Democrat), while Carl Paladino and local Tea Party activists endorsed Republican Kevin Stocker in a primary contest against Grisanti. The Democrats nominated Hamburg Attorney Michael Amodeo, who faced a primary challenge from Swanick as well as former Senator Al Coppola. Additionally, Kenmore Mayor Patrick Mang was endorsed by the Working Families Party.  Amodeo and Grisanti won their respective primaries, setting up a three-way contest between Amodeo, Grisanti, and Swanick in November.  Grisanti prevailed.

Democrats also gained seats in Senate Districts 17 (where Democrat Simcha Felder defeated Republican incumbent David Storobin) and 55 (where Ted O'Brien defeated Sean Hanna).

In Senate District 46—a new district that was created through the redistricting process following the 2010 census—the Republican candidate who was sworn in as the victor was later found, following a recount, to have lost the election. Republican George Amedore was sworn in to the State Senate following the election, but a recount revealed that Democrat Cecilia Tkaczyk had defeated Amedore by 18 votes; therefore, Amedore vacated the seat, becoming the shortest-tenured senator in modern New York history.

While 33 Democrats prevailed on Election Day, the Democratic Party did not regain control of the Senate. On December 4, 2012, Senate Republicans announced a power-sharing deal with the five-member Independent Democratic Conference, which had defected from the Senate Democratic leadership in 2011.  Under that agreement, Republican Leader Dean Skelos and IDC Leader Jeff Klein would alternate every two weeks as Temporary President of the Senate. The agreement allowed the Republicans and the IDC to jointly control the Senate in spite of the Democrats' 33-30 numerical advantage. In addition, Democratic Senator-elect Simcha Felder stated that he would caucus with the Republicans.

Open seats
 4th District: Fifteen-term incumbent Republican Owen H. Johnson, 83, did not seek re-election.  Assemblyman Philip Boyle was endorsed by the Republican, Conservative and Independence Parties. Boyle defeated Democrat Ricardo Montano.
 29th District: Seven-term incumbent Democrat Thomas Duane did not seek re-election in this predominantly LGBT district; Brad Hoylman sought the seat and was elected without opposition.
 37th District: 14-term Democratic Senator Suzi Oppenheimer did not seek re-election. Democratic Assemblyman George S. Latimer defeated Republican Bob Cohen in November.
46th District: This newly created district stretches from Montgomery County south to Ulster County.  Assemblyman George Amedore ran on the Republican line against Democrat Cecilia Tkaczyk. On January 17, 2013, the final recount was certified, and Tkaczyk was declared the winner by 18 votes.
55th District: Incumbent Republican Senator James Alesi announced that he would not seek re-election, citing concerns about his ability to prevail against a potential primary challenger following his controversial 2011 vote in favor of same-sex marriage.  Monroe County Legislator Ted O'Brien ran as a Democrat, and Assemblyman Sean Hanna received the Republican nomination.  O'Brien defeated Hanna.

State Assembly
On March 20, 2012, special elections were held to fill vacant seats in New York State Assembly districts 93, 100, 103, and 145. In November 2012, elections were held for all 150 Assembly seats. On Election Day, Democrats retained control of the Assembly by a wide margin.

March 20 special elections
93rd District: This seat became vacant after Mike Spano was elected as the mayor of Yonkers.  Democratic Party nominee Shelley B. Mayer defeated Republican Party nominee Donna Nolan.
100th District:  This seat became vacant after Thomas Kirwan died in November 2011.  Democratic Party nominee Frank Skartados defeated Republican Party member John Forman.
103rd District: This seat became vacant after Assemblymember Marcus Molinaro was elected  Dutchess County Executive.  Democratic Party nominee Didi Barrett narrowly prevailed over Republican candidate Richard Wager.
145th District:  This seat became vacant after Mark J. F. Schroeder was elected Comptroller of the City of Buffalo.  Democrat Michael P. Kearns, running on the Republican Party line, defeated Democratic Party nominee Chris Fahey.

Open seats
7th District: Incumbent Republican Philip Boyle declined renomination to his South Shore Suffolk seat in order to accept the nomination to replace State Senator Owen Johnson.  Republican attorney Andrew Garbarino defeated Democrat Christopher Bodkin.
10th District: Due to health reasons, Incumbent Republican James Conte declined renomination to his Huntington-based seat. Attorney and former Suffolk County Deputy County Executive Joe Dujmic, the Democratic and Working Families Party candidate, faced adjunct professor and South Huntington School Board member Chad Lupinacci. Lupinacci prevailed.
22nd District: This newly drawn district is based in the central western portion of Nassau County and encompasses South Floral Park, Elmont and Valley Stream.  The Republican Party designated Sean Wright, an Assistant Town Attorney and Village Attorney, as their candidate.  The Democrats nominated Michaelle "Mickey" Solages, the sister of freshman County Legislator Carrie Solages. Solages prevailed.
25th District: Queens Community Board 11 Chairman Jerry Iannece announced he would seek the Democratic nomination for the seat vacated by Rory Lancman.  While endorsed by the party, Iannece faced a primary challenge Nily Rozic, former chief of staff to assemblyman Brian Kavanagh.  The winner of this primary, Rozic, defeated retired Republican postal worker Abraham Fuchs in the general election.
40th District: Assemblywoman Grace Meng sought the Democratic nomination in the vacant 6th Congressional District.  The Queens Democratic Party endorsed Ron Kim, but he faced a primary from newspaper owner Myungsuk Lee as well as Ethel Chen.  The Republicans endorsed Phil Gim, who faced a primary challenge from community activist Sunny Hahn.  Each primary set at least one candidate of Korean descent against one candidate of Chinese descent. Kim and Gim won their respective primaries, and Kim won the general election.
62nd District:  Assemblyman Lou Tobacco announced that he would not be seeking reelection.  The Republican party endorsed City Councilman Vincent Ignizio's chief of staff Joseph Borelli. Borelli defeated Democrat Anthony Mascolo.
91st District: This seat was vacated by George S. Latimer, who ran for State Senate instead. Longtime State Sen. Suzi Oppenheimer's chief of staff, Democrat Steve Otis, defeated Republican Rye Councilman William Villanova.
99th District: Republican incumbent Nancy Calhoun was redistricted from the 96th Assembly District into the 99th Assembly District and decided to retire. Goshen Mayor Kyle Roddey and Colin Schmitt, a former staff intern for Asm. Annie Rabbitt, announced that they would seek the Republican nomination. Roddey, who received the endorsement of the Orange County Republican Committee, the Independence Party, and the Conservative Party, won the primary.  The Democratic Party endorsed Woodbury Councilman James Skoufis for the seat. Skoufis defeated Roddey in the general election.
105th District: Republican incumbent Joel Miller announced that he would not seek re-election in this newly reconfigured Dutchess County district.  Former Assemblyman Pat Manning, former 2008 Congressional candidate Kieran Lalor, and Rich Wager sought the Republican nomination. Lalor received the Republican nomination and defeated Democrat Paul Curran.
109th District: The 104th Assembly District was reshaped into the 109th Assembly District. Democratic Jack McEneny, who represented District 104, announced he would not seek re-election. Six candidates ran for the Democratic nomination for this seat, including Chris Higgins, Pat Fahy, Jim Coyne, William McCarthy, Jr., Frank Commisso, Jr., and Margarita Perez. 2010 congressional candidate Ted Danz ran as a Republican. Fahy won the Democratic primary and defeated Danz in the general election.  
110th District: Assembly District 109 was reshaped into the current District 110. Democratic Asm. Robert Reilly announced he would not seek re-election.  Kevin Frazier (a staff member for Asm. Ronald Canestrari), Albany County Legislator Timothy Nichols, and Phillip G. Steck sought the Democratic nomination. Reilly's 2010 Republican opponent, Jennifer Whalen, ran again. Steck won the Democratic primary and defeated Whalen in the general election.
113th District: Republican Teresa Sayward announced she would not seek re-election. Queensbury town supervisor Dan Stec and former Congressional candidate Doug Hoffman sought the Republican nomination; Stec prevailed and defeated Democrat Dennis Tarantino in November.
133rd District: Republican Sean Hanna chose to run for New York State Senate instead of seeking re-election. Bill Nojay, a talk radio host on WYSL and WLEA, facted Richard Burke, the former mayor of Avon, in the Republican primary. Steuben County legislator Randy Weaver, whose last run for Assembly (against Philip Palmesano) in 2010 led to him being thrown off the ballot on a technicality, was the lone Democrat in the race. Nojay won the Republican primary, but Burke has the Conservative Party line. Nojay won the general election.
147th District: Republican Daniel Burling announced he would not seek re-election. Tea Party activist and frequent state senate candidate David DiPietro sought the seat as a Republican and obtained the Conservative Party endorsement. Dan Humiston and Christina Abt faced each other in a relatively rare Independence Party primary, with Abt securing the Working Families line and the Democratic line as well. Humiston, DiPietro, David Mariacher, and Christopher Lane sought the Republican nomination. DiPietro prevailed in the November election.

See also
 United States Senate election in New York, 2012
 United States House of Representatives elections in New York, 2012

References

External links
New York Board of Elections
York_New York at Ballotpedia
New York judicial elections, 2012 at Judgepedia
New York 2012 campaign finance data from OpenSecrets
New York Congressional Races in 2012 campaign finance data from OpenSecrets
Outside spending at the Sunlight Foundation

 
2012
New York